Vikram University Sports Complex is a multipurpose sports complex located in Ujjain, Madhya Pradesh. The stadium managed and owned by Vikram University.

The stadium has facilities for various sports, including cricket, football, and hockey. There are also facilities for indoor sports such as basketball, badminton, gymnastics, handball, volleyball, lawn tennis,  table tennis, weight lifting, and Kabbadi. The stadium has hosted few non-first-class cricket matches.

References

External links 
Vikram University website
Freepressjournal.in
 Cricketarchive
 Wikimapia

Malwa
Ujjain
Sports venues in Madhya Pradesh
Sports venues in Ujjain
Sport in Madhya Pradesh
Buildings and structures in Ujjain
Cricket grounds in Madhya Pradesh
Sports venues completed in 1960
1960 establishments in Madhya Pradesh
Sport in Ujjain
20th-century architecture in India